The Zafarani gas field is a natural gas field located in the Indian Ocean. It was discovered in 2012 and developed by and Statoil. The well that discovered Zafarani gas field was spudded in 2012. The total proven reserves of the Zafarani gas field are around 5 trillion cubic feet (143×109m³), and production is slated to be around 100 million cubic feet/day (2.9×105m³).

References

Natural gas fields in Tanzania